Santa Cristina e Bissone is a comune (municipality) in the province of Pavia, Lombardy, northern Italy, located about 45 km southeast of Milan and about 25 km southeast of Pavia.  

Santa Cristina e Bissone borders the following municipalities: Badia Pavese, Chignolo Po, Corteolona e Genzone, Costa de' Nobili, Inverno e Monteleone, Miradolo Terme, Pieve Porto Morone.

The town lies along the Via Francigena.

References

Cities and towns in Lombardy